Periya Idathu Pillai is a 1990 Indian Tamil-language film, written and directed by Senthilnathan. The film stars Arjun and Kanaka. It was released on 2 June 1990.

Plot

Cast 
 Arjun
 Kanaka
 C. R. Vijayakumari
 Goundamani
 Senthil
 Anandaraj
 Dipika Chikhlia
 Rajinikanth as himself (guest appearance)

Soundtrack 
Soundtrack was composed by Chandrabose, with lyrics by Vaali.

Reception 
P. S. S. of Kalki wrote that there is a lot to like, but the glaring artificialities and over-sentiment combine to make it a frustrating waste of something. Dina Thanthi wrote, in a response to a scene where Anandaraj's character rapes Dipika Chikhlia's character, "ராவணனால் கெடுக்க முடியாத சீதையை ஆனந்த்ராஜ் கெடுத்தார்", referring to Chikhlia's character from the TV series Ramayan.

References

External links 
 

1990 films
1990s Tamil-language films
Films directed by Senthilnathan
Films scored by Chandrabose (composer)